Rivervale is an inner eastern suburb of Perth, Western Australia. It is near the Swan River,  from the Perth central business district, and within the City of Belmont.

Rivervale was known as Barndon Hill until 1884.

References 

Suburbs of Perth, Western Australia
Suburbs in the City of Belmont